Renzo Zaffanella (23 October 1929 – 4 October 2020) was an Italian politician.

Biography
A member of the Italian Socialist Party, Zaffanella sat in the Chamber of Deputies representing Mantua and Cremona from 1968 to 1978. He was elected mayor of Cremona in 1980 and served until 1990.

References 

1929 births
2020 deaths
20th-century Italian politicians
Italian Socialist Party politicians
Mayors of Cremona
Deputies of Legislature VI of Italy
Deputies of Legislature V of Italy